Dhorpatan Hunting Reserve is the only hunting reserve in Nepal.

Flora and fauna 
The landscape consists of forests, marshland (called ḍhor), and flat meadows (called pāṭan). The higher elevations remain snow-covered throughout the year. 58 vascular plants have been recorded in the reserve. Flowering plants include 36 endemic species. 18 mammal species include snow leopard, musk deer, red panda, and blue sheep. 137 bird species include koklass pheasant, cheer pheasant, and impeyan pheasant; and two reptile species also occur.

References

External links

 Department of National Parks and Wildlife Conservation, Nepal : Dhorpatan Hunting Reserve 

Protected areas of Nepal
1987 establishments in Nepal
Hunting in Nepal